Charsley may refer to:

Chris Charsley (1864–1945), English footballer
Harry Charsley (born 1996), English-born Irish professional footballer
Walter Charsley (1869–1948), English footballer born in Stafford
William Henry Charsley (1820–1900), English academic, Master of Charsley's Hall, Oxford from 1862 to 1891

See also
Charsley Hall or Charsley's Hall, private hall of the University of Oxford
Carsley (disambiguation)
Charley (disambiguation)
Chearsley